A. Van Leuven served as a member of the 1863-65 California State Assembly, representing California's 1st State Senate district.

References

Members of the California State Assembly
California state senators
19th-century American politicians
Year of birth missing